PSR J1544+4937 is a pulsar and gamma-ray source. A millisecond pulsar, it has a very short rotation period of 2.16 milliseconds. It has a planet or brown dwarf, PSR J1544+4937 b.

See also 

 Black Widow Pulsar

References 

Pulsars
Boötes